An open-source bounty is a monetary reward for completing a task in an open-source software project.

Description
Bounties are usually offered as an incentive for fixing software bugs or implementing minor features. Bounty driven development is one of the business models for open-source software.  The compensation offered for an open-source bounty is usually small.

Examples of bounties

 2018: Mozilla Firefox's WebRTC (Web Real-Time Communications) bug was submitted by Education First to Bountysource for $50,000.
 Sun MicroSystems (now owned by Oracle Corporation) has offered $1 million in bounties for OpenSolaris, NetBeans, OpenSPARC, GlassFish, OpenOffice.org, and OpenJDK.  
 2004: Mozilla introduced a Security Bug Bounty Program, offering $500 to anyone who finds a "critical" security bug in Mozilla.
 2015: Artifex Software offers up to $1000 to anyone who fixes some of the issues posted on Ghostscript Bugzilla.
 Two software bounties were completed for the classic Commodore Amiga Motorola 680x0 version of the AROS operating system, producing a free Kickstart ROM replacement for use with the UAE emulator and FPGA Amiga reimplementations, as well as original Amiga hardware.
 RISC OS Open bounty scheme to encourage development of RISC OS
 AmiZilla was an over $11,000 bounty to port the Firefox web-browser to AmigaOS, MorphOS & AROS. While the bounty produced little results it inspired many bounty systems in the Amiga community including Timberwolf, Power2people, AROS Bounties, Amigabounty.net and many more.

See also 
 Bountysource
 Bug bounty program
 Business models for open-source software
 Crowdfunding
 Google Summer of Code

References 

Free software
Grants (money)
Philanthropy